is the self-titled fifth studio album by the Japanese girl band Princess Princess, released on December 21, 1990, by CBS Sony. It includes the band's fourth No. 1 single "Julian". The album also features songs with different members doing vocals: "Sabitsuki Blues" with lead guitarist Kanako Nakayama and "Tsukiyo no Dekigoto" with keyboardist Tomoko Konno.

The album hit No. 1 on Oricon's albums chart, making it the band's second of five consecutive No. 1 albums. It was also certified as a Million seller and Triple Platinum by the RIAJ.

Track listing 
All music is composed by Kaori Okui, except where indicated; all music is arranged by Princess Princess.

Charts

Certification

References

External links
 
 
 

Princess Princess (band) albums
1990 albums
Sony Music Entertainment Japan albums
Japanese-language albums